Baher Char may refer to:

Baher Char, Barisal, Bangladesh
Baher Char, Chittagong, Bangladesh